Kill the Love is a 1996 South Korean crime drama film.

Plot
When Love, the protagonist, joins the Korean Underworld in United States, he falls in love with a nightclub dancer. As a result, his friend wants to kill him.

Cast
 Lee Byung-hun as Love
Jeong Seon-kyeong as Choonhyang
 Yu Oh-seong as Paikjoon
Park Geun-hyung
Song Ok-sook
Kwon Yong-woon
Park Dong-chun
Jeong Seong-gi
Park Soo-yun

External links
 
 

South Korean crime drama films
South Korean romance films
1996 films
1996 crime drama films
1990s Korean-language films